This is a list of railway stations in Bangladesh division-wise:

Existing

Dhaka Division

Dhaka District
Airport railway station
Banani railway station
Cantonment railway station
Gendaria railway station
Kamalapur railway station
Shyampur Baraitala railway station
Tejgaon railway station

Faridpur District
Ambikapur Railway Station
Amirabad Railway Station
Bakhunda Railway Station
Boalmari Railway Station
Faridpur College railway station
Faridpur railway station
Ghorakhali Railway Station
Kamarkhali Ghat Railway Station
Madhukhali Junction Railway Station
Pukhuria Railway Station
Shahasrail Railway Station
Shatoir Railway Station
Talma Railway Station
Bhanga railway station

Gazipur District
 Arikhola Railway Station
Bangabandhu Hi-Tech City railway station
Bhawal Gazipur Railway Station
Dhirashram railway station
Izzatpur Railway Station
Joydebpur Junction Railway Station
Kaoraid Railway Station
Mouchak Railway Station
Nalchata Railway Station
Pubail Railway Station
Rajendrapur Railway Station
Shat Khamair Railway Station
Shripur Railway Station
Tongi Junction railway station

Kishoreganj District
 Bajitpur Railway Station
Bhairab Bazar Junction railway station
Choyshuti Railway Station
Gochihata Railway Station
Halimpur Mokshud Railway Station
Joshodolpur Railway Station
Kalikaproshad Railway Station
Kishorganj Railway Station
Kuliarchor Railway Station
Manikkhali Railway Station
Nilganj Railway Station
Shorarchor Railway Station

Narayanganj District
Chashara railway station
Fatullah railway station
Narayanganj railway station
Pagla Halt railway station

Narsingdi District
 Amirgonj Railway Station
 Doulatkandi Railway Station
 Ghorashal Railway Station
 Ghorashal Flag Railway Station
 Jinarodi Railway Station
 Hatuvanga Railway Station
 Khanabari Railway Station
 Methikanda Railway Station
 Narsingdi railway station
 Shrinidhi Railway Station

Tangail District
Bangabandhu Bridge East Railway Station
Hemnagar Railway Station
Korotia Railway Station
Mirzapur Railway Station
Mohera Railway Station
Tangail Railway Station
Vuiyapur Railway Station

Chittagong Division

Chandpur District
Balakhal Railway Station
 Chandpur Railway Station
Chadpur Court Railway Station
Chtoshi Road Railway Station
Haziganj Railway Station
Meher Railway Station
Madhu Road Railway Station
Maishadi Railway Station
Shahrasti Railway Station
Shahtoli Railway Station
Waruk Railway Station

Brahmanbaria District
Akhaura Junction railway station
Brahmanbaria Railway Station
Gangasagor Railway Station
Imambari Railway Station
Kosba Railway Station
Mondobag Railway Station
Montola Railway Station
Paghachang Railway Station
Shaldandi Railway Station
Shashidol Railway Station
Talshohor Railway Station
Vatshala Railway Station

Chittagong District
 Barobokundo Railway Station
 Baroiyadhala Railway Station
 Bartakia Railway Station
 Chinki Astana Railway Station
Chittagong Railway Station
 Chittagong Junction Railway Station
 Chittagong University railway station
 Faujdarhat Railway Station
 Kaibollo Dham Railway Station
 Kumira Railway Station
 Mastan Nagar Railway Station
 Mirshorai Railway Station
 Nijampur College Railway Station
 Pahartoli Railway Station
 Sitakundo Railway Station
 Vatiari Railway Station

Comilla District
Alisshor Railway Station
Bipulashar Railway Station
Comilla railway station
Doulotganj Railway Station
Gunabati Railway Station
Hasanpur Railway Station
Khila Railway Station
Laksam Junction Railway Station
Lalmai Railway Station
Mainamati Railway Station
 Nangol Coat Railway Station
 Naoti Railway Station
Nather Petua Railway Station
Rajapur Railway Station
Sadar Rosulpur Railway Station

Feni District
 Anandapur Railway Station
Bandua Daulatpur Railway Station
Bilonia Railway Station
Chithlia Railway Station
 Fazilpur Railway Station
Feni Junction railway station
Fulgachi Railway Station
 Kalidoho Railway Station
 Muhuriganj Railway Station
Munsirhat Railway Station
Parshuram Railway Station
Pirboxhat Railway Station
 Sharshadi Railway Station

Noakhali District
 Bozra Railway Station
 Choumuhoni Railway Station
 Harinarayanpur Railway Station
Maizdi Court Railway Station
 Maizdi Railway Station
 Noakhali Railway Station
 Shonaimuri Railway Station

Sylhet Division

Habiganj District
 Loshkorpur Railway Station
Rashidpur Railway Station
Satiajuri Railway Station
Shaestagonj Railway Station
Shahzibazar Railway Station
Shutang Railway Station

Moulvibazar District
 Boromchal Railway Station
Chokapon Railway Station
Kulaura Junction Railway Station
Monu Railway Station
Longla Railway Station
Shamshernagar Railway Station
Shatgaon Railway Station
Shrimongol Railway Station
Tilgaon Railway Station
Vanugach Railway Station

Sunamganj District
Afzalabad Railway Station
Chhatak Bazar Railway Station

Sylhet District
 Fenchugonj Railway Station
Khajanjigaon Railway Station
Maizgaon Railway Station
Moglabazar Railway Station
Shotpur Halt Railway Station
Sylhet Railway Station
Vatera Bazar Railway Station

Mymensingh Division

Jamalpur District
 Adv. Motiur Rahman Railway Station
Bahadurabad Ghat Railway Station
Bausi Railway Station
Boyra Railway Station
Dewangonj Bazar Railway Station
Durmuth Railway Station
Islampur Bazar Railway Station
Jaforshahi Railway Station
Jagannathganj Ghat Railway Station
Jamalpur Court Railway Station
Jamalpur Railway Station
Kendua Bazar Railway Station
Melandoho Bazar Railway Station
Mosharofganj Railway Station
Nandina Railway Station
Nurundi Railway Station
Piyarpur Railway Station
Shahid Nagar Railway Station
Sharishabari Railway Station
Tarakandi Railway Station

Mymensingh District
 Agriculture University Railway Station
Ahmadbari Railway Station
Atharbari Railway Station
Aulianagar Railway Station
Baigonbari Railway Station
Biddyaganj Railway Station
Bishka Railway Station
Bokainagar Railway Station
Dhola Railway Station
Fatemanagar Railway Station
Gafargaon Railway Station
Gouripur Junction railway station
Ishwarganj Railway Station
Nandail Railway Station
Nimtoli Bazar Railway Station
Moshakhali Railway Station
Moshiurnagar Railway Station
Mushuli Railway Station
Mymensingh Junction railway station
Mymensingh Road Railway Station
Shohagi Railway Station
Shomvuganj Railway Station
Shutiyakhali Railway Station
Shyamganj Junction Railway Station

Netrokona District
 Bangla Railway Station
Barhatta Railway Station
Chollishanagar Railway Station
Hironpur Railway Station
Jalshuka Railway Station
Jaria Jhanjail Railway Station
Mohonganj Railway Station
Netrokona Court Railway Station
Netrokona Railway Station
Otitpur Railway Station
Purbadhola Railway Station
Thakurkona Railway Station

Rajshahi Division

Bogra District
Adamdighi Railway Station
Altafnagar Railway Station
Bogra Railway Station
Chatian Gram Railway Station
Gabtali Railway Station
Helaliarhat Railway Station
Kahalu Railway Station
Nosrotpur Railway Station
Pachpir Majar Railway Station
Santahar Junction Railway Station
Sonatala Railway Station
Sukhanpulur Railway Station
Syed Ahmed College Railway Station
Talora Railway Station
Velurpara Railway Station

Chapai Nawabganj District
 Amnura Junction Railway Station
Golabari Railway Station
Nachol Railway Station
Nijampur Railway Station
Chapai Nawabganj Railway Station 
Rohanpur Railway Station

Joypurhat District
Akkelpur Railway Station
Bagjana Railway Station
Jafarpur Railway Station
Jamalganj Railway Station
Joypurhat Railway Station
Panchbibi Railway Station
Tilakpur Railway Station

Naogaon District
Ahsanganj Railway Station
Atrai Railway Station
Raninagar Railway Station
Shahagola Railway Station

Natore District
 Abdulpur Junction railway station
Azimnagar Railway Station
Basudebpur Railway Station
Birkutsha Railway Station
Easinpur Railway Station
Ishwardi Bypass Railway Station
Lokmanpur Railway Station
Madhnagar Railway Station
Majhgram Railway Station
Malanchi Railway Station
Natore Railway Station
Noldangarhat Railway Station

Pabna District
Badherhat Railway Station
Boral Bridge Railway Station
Chatmohor Railway Station
Chinakhora Railway Station
Dashuria Railway Station
Dhalarchar Railway Station
Dilpashar Railway Station
Dublia Railway Station
Gofurabad Railway Station
Guakhora Railway Station
Iswardi Junction Railway Station
Kashinathpur Railway Station
Majhgram Railway Station
Muladuli Railway Station
Pabna Railway Station
Pakshi Railway Station
Raghobpur Railway Station
Shorotnagar Railway Station
Tatibondho Railway Station
Tebunia Railway Station
Vangura Railway Station

Rajshahi District
 Arani Railway Station
Belpukur Railway Station
Chobbishnagar Railway Station
Horiyan Railway Station
Kakonhat Railway Station
Lolitonagar Railway Station
Nandangachi Railway Station
Rajshahi Court Railway Station
Rajshahi Railway Station
Rajshahi University Railway Station
Shitlai Railway Station
Shorodoho Railway Station

Sirajganj District
Bahirgola Railway Station
Bangabandhu Bridge West Railway Station
Jamtoeel Railway Station
Kalia Horipur Railway Station
Lahiri Mohonpur Railway Station
Raypur Railway Station
Shahid M. Monshur Ali Railway Station
Sholop Railway Station
Sirajganj Bazar Railway Station
Sirajganj Ghat Railway Station, W, river port terminus of branch from Iswardi, bypassed by Jamuna Bridge in 2003
Ullapara Railway Station

Rangpur Division

Dinajpur District
Bajnahar Railway Station
Bilaichondi Railway Station
Birampur Railway Station
Biral Railway Station
Chirirbondor Railway Station
Dangapara Railway Station
Dinajpur Railway Station
Fulbari Railway Station
Hili Railway Station
Kanchon Railway Station
Kaugaon Railway Station
Kholahati Railway Station
Mollapara Railway Station
Mongolpur Railway Station
Monmothpur Railway Station
Parbatipur Junction Railway Station
Setabgonj Railway Station
Sultanpur School Railway Station
Vobanipur Railway Station

Kurigram District
 Balabari Railway Station
 Chilmari Railway Station
 Kurigram Railway Station
 Panchpir Railway Station
 Puraton Kurigram Railway Station
 Rajarhat Railway Station
 Ramna Bazar Railway Station
 Shinger Dabrihat Railway Station
 Tograihat Railway Station
 Ulipur Railway Station

Lalmonirhat District
 Aditmari Railway Station
Alauddinnagar Railway Station
Baura Railway Station
Borokhata Railway Station
Burimari Railway Station
Hatibandha Railway Station
Kakina Railway Station
Lalmonirhat Railway Station
Mogalhat Railway Station
Mohendronagar Railway Station
Namurirhat Railway Station
Patgram Railway Station
Roishbag Railway Station
Shahid Borhannagar Railway Station
Tista Railway Station
Tushvandar Railway Station
Votmari Railway Station

Nilphamari District
Chilahati Railway Station
Darowani Railway Station
Domar Railway Station
Khoyratnagar Railway Station
Mirzaganj Railway Station
Nilphamari College Railway Station
Nilphamari Railway Station
Syedpur Railway Station
Torunbari Railway Station

Rangpur District
Awliaganj Railway Station
Annadannagar Railway Station
Bodorganj Railway Station
Choudhurani Railway Station
Kaunia Railway Station
Mirbag Railway Station
Pirgacha Railway Station
Rangpur Railway Station
Shyampur Railway Station

Khulna Division
Bagerhat District 

1. Katakhali Railway station 

2 . Culkati Railway station

3. Bagha Railway station 

4. Digraj Railways Station

5. Mongla Railway Station

Chuadanga District
Ansarbaria Railway Station
Alamdanga Railway Station
Chuadanga Railway Station
Darshana Junction Railway Station
Darshana Halt Railway Station
Darshana Railway Station
Gaidghat Railway Station
Joyrampur Railway Station
Mominpur Railway Station
Munsigonj Railway Station
Uthli Railway Station

Jessore District
 Benapole Railway station
Chengutia Railway Station
Jessore Cantonment Railway Station
Jessore Junction Railway Station
Jhikorgacha Railway Station
Meherullanagar Railway Station
Navaron Railway Station
Nowapara Railway Station
Rupdia Railway Station
Singia railway station

Khulna District
 Arongghata Railway Station
Bejerdanga Railway Station
Doulotpur College Railway Station
Doulotpur Railway Station
Phultala Railway Station
Karnapur Railway Station
Khulna Junction Railway Station
Khulna Railway Station
Mohammadnagar Railway Station
Nowapara Railway Station
Purba Rupsha Railway Station
Shamontosena Railway Station

Kushtia District
Bheramara railway station
Choraikol railway station
Halsha railway station
Jagati railway station
Khoksha railway station
Kumarkhali railway station
Kushtia Court railway station
Kushtia railway station
Mirpur railway station
Poradah Junction railway station

Proposed 
 Bogra Contonment railway station
 Bhanga Junction railway station
 Keraniganj railway station
 Cox's Bazar Railway Station
 Ramu Junction railway station
 Gundhum railway station
 Kaptai Railway Station
 Sheikh Rasel Railway Station
 Barisal Railway Station
 Patuakhali Railway Station
 Payra Airport Railway Station
 Payra Railway Station
 Kuakata Railway Station
 Meherpur Railway Station
 Narail Railway Station
 Plan to put all trains on broad-gauge lines by 2040

Maps 
 Rail route map from Bangladesh Railway.
 Rail route map 2002  - Does not show dual gauge or Jamuna bridge or border stations or borders.
 UNJCL Map
 UNHCR Map - Does not show Jamuna bridge.

See also 
List of passenger trains in Bangladesh
List of rail accidents in Bangladesh
List of railway lines in Bangladesh

References

External links 
 Rail route map from Bangladesh Railway
 Rail route map 2002  - Does not show dual gauge or Jamuna bridge or border stations or borders.
 UNJCL Map
 UNHCR Map - Does not show Jamuna bridge

 
Bangladesh
Railway stations
Railway stations